Scopula sideraria is a moth of the  family Geometridae. It is found in western North America, from southern British Columbia to San Diego County, California.

Adults are highly variable in colour, ranging from dark brown to bright orange. It is a day-flying species.

References

Moths described in 1858
sideraria
Moths of North America